"Hollywood Tonight" is a song by American singer-songwriter Michael Jackson, included on his posthumous album, Michael. The song was released by Epic Records on February 11, 2011, as the second single from Michael. The spoken parts were performed by Jackson's nephew, Taryll Jackson and written by Teddy Riley. An accompanying music video was released on March 10, 2011. It features Algerian dancer Sofia Boutella dressed in a Jackson-inspired outfit performing a routine with 60 dancers.

Background and release
The song was written by Michael Jackson during the time of the Invincible album. Michael pulled the track out of the archives in 2007 to work on the song with producer Theron "Neff-U" Feemster. Jackson first put down a sketch of the lyrics in 1999, then he began working out the music with longtime friend and collaborator, Brad Buxer, who co-wrote the song. Over the next ten years, Jackson returned to the track numerous times. Jackson and Brad Buxer continued tinkering with it in Las Vegas in 2007. In October 2008, when Jackson lived in Los Angeles, he asked recording engineer Michael Prince to put the latest mix of the song on CD so he could listen to it and see what might be improved, but he never got around to working on it again. Teddy Riley co-produced the song along with Theron "Neff-U" Feemster following Jackson's death. Riley also wrote a new bridge, performed by Taryll Jackson, that included different lyrics from those left by Jackson.

On December 3, 2010, before the album Michael'''s release, the song premiered on The Ellen DeGeneres Show. The song was first released as a single to radio stations in Italy, on February 11, 2011, and it was first listed on BBC Radio 2's playlist A one-day later. In Poland, the song was released on February 14, 2011. A later announcement from the official Jackson website stated that "Behind the Mask" would be released as a radio single in the United States, Canada, Japan and France, with "Hollywood Tonight" taking its place for the rest of the world. Despite this, "Hollywood Tonight" was released to urban contemporary and adult contemporary radio stations in the US on April 5, 2011.

Reception

The song received generally positive reviews from music critics. Teddy Riley, the producer said, "I was looking at just doing the next level of "Billie Jean" meets "Dangerous" or "Leave Me Alone." It's like one of those driving bass lines that you will remember." Joe Vogel of The Huffington Post stated that the song was "definitely an album highlight. The song begins with a haunting Gothic church choir, before transforming into an energetic dance stomper", and "The track features Michael in a notably deeper voice, and concludes with military-style whistling". Leah Greenblatt of Entertainment Weekly said the song "feels leaner and more urgent, crackling with Jackson's trademark percussive shuffle and pop." Dan Martin of NME called the album Michael "not as terrible as you may think", and "the worst thing you can say about "Hollywood Tonight" is that its catchy signature gets annoying after a while." Jason Lipshutz, Gail Mitchell and Gary Graff from Billboard thought the song "sounds like Britney Spears' 'Lucky' crossed with Justin Timberlake's 'LoveStoned.'" Neil McCormick of Daily Telegraph said, "it has the extraordinary confidence of a pop classic and presages an album that may well be Jackson's best work since his Eighties glory days." Jim Farber of the Daily News praised "Hollywood Tonight" for exhibiting Jackson's "old verve." Gerard McGarry of Shout! Music Magazine stated that "while this single doesn't quite touch on the greatness of classic Jackson tracks, it does recall that infectious disco groove that used to be his trademark. There's a strong 80's vibe to Hollywood Tonight - even the female dancer in the video looks like a young Brooke Shields, who Michael was linked to in the 80's."

Negative review comes from Carl Cortez of Assignment X for the "throwback mix" on 7 inch single and music video, he said the mix is "a little sharper than the original, but again, the song really isn't all that good. Another previously unreleased B-side or even the original demo might have been more interesting."

Chart performance
"Hollywood Tonight" was released as the second single from the album, Michael, in most territories. Due to the massive airplay on BBC Radio 2 in the United Kingdom, the song debuted at number 38 on The UK Radio Airplay Chart on Week 7, 2011 (from February 13 to February 19, 2011), and peaked at number 35 on Week 8, 2011 (from February 20 to February 26, 2011).

In the United States, the song debuted at number 89 on the Billboard Hot R&B/Hip-Hop Songs chart for the week ending April 16, 2011, marking Jackson's 52nd solo hit on this chart, and peaked at number 60. It debuted at number 36 on the Billboard Hot Dance Club Songs chart for the week ending April 30, 2011, and on June 11, 2011, it became Jackson's first number-one hit on the chart since his 1995 hit "Scream" and his 13th overall as a solo artist.

Music video
Jackson's official website announced a music video for "Hollywood Tonight". While expected originally to be released at the end of February, it was later pushed back to March 10, 2011. A 19-second sneak preview of the video was made available on Jackson's official Facebook page. On March 10, as expected the full video was released with a new mix called "Throwback Mix", featuring alternate demo vocals without autotune, sampling the beat of "Billie Jean" and removing the spoken word bridge.

The video was directed by Wayne Isham, who previously directed the video for Jackson's 1995 number-one hit "You Are Not Alone". It was shot in front of the Pantages Theatre in Hollywood, California.

The lead dancer in the video is Sofia Boutella, who wears an outfit inspired by Jackson's stage costumes. More than 60 dancers performed a Jackson-inspired routine as seen in a video posted by TMZ. The video revolves around a young woman arriving in Hollywood, vying to become a known dancer. It also includes images of Jackson from the music videos for "Black or White", "Billie Jean", "Jam", "Don't Stop 'til You Get Enough" and "In the Closet."

Michael Jackson: The Experience
"Hollywood Tonight" is a playable song in the PlayStation Vita, Nintendo 3DS and iOS versions of Michael Jackson: The Experience''.

Track listing

Official versions
 Album Version 4:31
 Radio Edit 3:46
 Demo 5:26
 Throwback Mix 3:46
 Throwback Mix With Intro (Video Mix) 3:59
 Throwback Instrumental 3:59
 Throwback Instrumental - No Beatbox 4:00
 DJ Chuckie Remix 6:01
 DJ Chuckie Remix - No Talk 6:01
 DJ Chuckie Radio Edit 3:53
 DJ Chuckie Dub 5:00
 Jody Den Broeder Extended Vocal Mix 6:53
 Jody Den Broeder Dub 6:53
 Jody Den Broeder Radio Edit 3:51
 Yiannis Walk Of Fame Mix 7:11
 Yiannis Walk Of Fame Dub 7:07
 Theron "Neff-U" Feemster Mix 4:09
 Recall 3 Main 4:29
 Recall 3 Background Vocals Down 4:29
 Recall 3 Instrumental 4:29
 Recall 3 A Capella 3:53

Charts

Weekly charts

Year-end charts

Release history

Personnel
 Originally written and composed by Michael Jackson
Soprano Voice by Michael Jackson 
Updated version writers Brad Buxer, Teddy Riley.
 Spoken bridge written by Teddy Riley
 Produced by Teddy Riley and Michael Jackson
 Co-produced by Theron "Neff-U" Feemster and Brad Buxer
 Arrangement by Michael Jackson, Teddy Riley and Theron "Neff-U" Feemster
 Mixed by Jean-Marie Horvat, Teddy Riley and Scott Elgin
 Mix Engineers: John Hanes assisted by Tim Roberts, Jean Marie Horvat, Teddy Riley, Scott Elgin
 Programming and Finisher: Teddy Riley
 Additional Background Vocals: Mischke
 Vocals recorded by Michael Durham Prince and Mischke
 Spoken Bridge Written by Teddy Riley and Labyron Walton
 Spoken Bridge by Taryll Jackson
 Whistling: Danny Ray McDonald Jr. Michael Jackson, and Michael Durham Prince
 Beat Box by Michael Jackson
 Engineered by Scott Elgin, James Murray, Michael Durham Prince and Jon Nettlesbey
 Assistant Engineer: Quentinn Gilkey
 Keyboard: Theron "Neff-U" Feemster and Edward Brown
 Guitar: Erick Donell Walls and Eric Jackson
 Guitar Engineer: Cristian Delano
 Horns: The Regiment
 Drum Programming by Brad Buxer and Theron "Neff-U" Feemster

See also
 List of unreleased Michael Jackson material
 Death of Michael Jackson
 List of works published posthumously
 List of number-one dance singles of 2011 (U.S.)

References

2010 songs
2011 singles
Michael Jackson songs
Songs written by Michael Jackson
Songs written by Teddy Riley
Song recordings produced by Michael Jackson
Song recordings produced by Teddy Riley
Song recordings produced by Theron Feemster
Songs released posthumously
Music videos directed by Wayne Isham
American hip hop songs